Jupânești is a commune in Gorj County, Oltenia, Romania. It is composed of five villages: Boia, Jupânești, Pârâu Boia, Vidin and Vierșani.

References

Communes in Gorj County
Localities in Oltenia